The Kansas Museum of History is the state historical museum in Topeka, Kansas, United States. The galleries feature a train (Atchison, Topeka and Santa Fe locomotive with two cars), full-sized tipi in the Southern Cheyenne style, a 1950s diner, and many other large features. Major topics covered in the main gallery include Native American tribal history, westward movement on the Oregon and Santa Fe trails, early settlers, the Bleeding Kansas and Civil War eras, and Populism at the turn of the 20th century.

History
The museum is a division of the Kansas Historical Society, which was founded in 1875 by Kansas newspaper editors and publishers. Its first home was in the Kansas State Capitol.

The current museum building was built in 1980s to house the Society's object collections and exhibits. Dubbed the Kansas Museum of History, it opened in 1984 at an  site in west Topeka near the historic Potawatomi Mission. In addition to galleries, the building also houses a museum store, classrooms, and labs for conservation and exhibit fabrication.

In the mid-1990s, the rest of the Society's divisions moved to the new Center for Historical Research adjacent to the museum. Today the complex includes nature trails, an education and conference center, and a historic one-room school used for educational programs.

The museum's most popular programs include its changing exhibits schedule, the Cool Things section of the website (featuring interesting objects from the collections), and the related Cool Things podcasts.

Gallery
The museum gallery sections are grouped by chronological order:

 5000 b.c. to 1820 a.d. - Early People.
 1820 to 1860 a.d. - Trails.
 1861 to 1865 a.d. - Civil War.
 1865 to 1880 a.d. - Settling the Frontier.
 1880 to 1900 a.d. - Trains and Towns.
 1900 to 1940 a.d. - Early 20th Century.
 1940 to 1990 a.d. - Recent Past.
 Special Exhibits.

Important exhibited objects include:
 John Brown's pike.
 William Quantrill's flag.
 George Armstrong Custer's riding boots.
 Carrie A. Nation's hammer.
 William Allen White's printing press.
 Dwight D. Eisenhower's World War II field jacket.

The museum also holds one of the United States' largest collections of Civil War flags from African American regiments. At least one of these flags is always on display in the main gallery.

Awards and honors
The Kansas Museum of History's main gallery and changing exhibits have won numerous Awards of Merit, the highest honor bestowed by the American Association for State and Local History.  The museum is accredited by the American Alliance of Museums.

See also
 List of museums in Kansas
 History of Kansas

References

Further reading
 "Building the Kansas Museum of History", Kansas History, Vol. 7, No. 1, Spring 1984. Topeka: Kansas State Historical Society, 40–45.
 "Voices from the Heartland:  A Kansas Legacy", The Public Historian, Vol. 12, No. 1, Winter 1990. Santa Barbara, CA: University of California, 123–127.

External links

 Kansas Museum of History home page at the Kansas Historical Society
 Kansas Museum of History - Kansas Sampler

Museums in Topeka, Kansas
History museums in Kansas
History of Kansas
Institutions accredited by the American Alliance of Museums
Museums established in 1875